Brennan Ward (born June 28, 1988) is an American professional mixed martial artist currently competing in Bellator MMA. A professional competitor since 2008, Ward formerly competed for CES MMA and was the Bellator Season Nine Middleweight Tournament Winner.

As of February 7, 2023, he is #8 in the Bellator Welterweight Rankings.

Background
Ward was born in New London, Connecticut and raised in Waterford, Connecticut. Ward's father, Kent, owns a boxing gym, Whaling City Boxing (New London), where Ward began training from a young age. He competed in wrestling at Waterford High School, graduating in 2006, before continuing his career at Colby Community College. Ward later transferred to Johnson & Wales University, which has a Division III program. At Johnson & Wales, Ward demonstrated his talents, earning All-American honors and was also the runner-up in the nation for his weight class, after winning the New England title.

Mixed martial arts career

Early career
Ward started his professional career in 2008, but only became active in 2012. He fought mainly for Rhode Island's promotion Classic Entertainment and Sports (CES MMA).

With a record of 5 and 0, Ward signed with Bellator.

Bellator MMA
Ward was expected to make his debut against Valter Roberto on November 16, 2012, at Bellator 81. However, Roberto was replaced by Sam McCoy due to undisclosed reasons. Ward won via KO in the very first round.

Ward faced Aaron Johnson on February 14, 2013, at Bellator 89. He had his first career's defeat via submission at 15 seconds of round one.

Ward was expected to face Vadiano La Luz on February 28, 2013, at Bellator 91. However, La Luz was replaced by Yair Moguel due to undisclosed reasons. Ward won via submission due to a rear-naked choke in the first round.

Ward was expected to face Dave Vitkay on September 7, 2013, at Bellator 98. However, he was called to replace Andreas Spång against Justin Torrey in the quarterfinal match of Bellator Season Nine Middleweight Tournament at the same event. Ward won via TKO in the second round and advanced to the semifinal.

Ward was expected to face Perry Filkins in the semifinal on October 4, 2013, at Bellator 102. Filkins, however, was injured and replaced by Joe Pacheco. Ward won the fight via submission in the second round.

Ward faced Mikkel Parlo in the finals on November 8, 2013, at Bellator 107. He won the fight via TKO due to punches in the second round.

Ward faced Bellator Middleweight Champion Alexander Shlemenko at Bellator 114 on March 28, 2014. Despite doing well in the first round, Ward lost the bout due to a submission early in the second round.

Ward was expected to face James Irvin at Bellator 123 on September 5, 2014, however, the bout was cancelled for unknown reasons. Ward instead faced Tamdan McCrory on the same card. Ward lost the bout via knockout in the first round.

Ward was expected to make his Welterweight debut against Jesse Juarez on February 27, 2015, at Bellator 134. However, Ward has been moved up to the main card to face Curtis Millender after Millender's opponent, Michael Page, pulled out of the fight due to a cut over his left eye. Ward defeated Millender via submission in the first round.

Ward was expected to face English fighter Gavin Sterritt at Bellator 140 on July 17, 2015. However, a week before the fight, his opponent was changed to Roger Carroll. Ward won the fight via knockout in the first round.

Ward next faced Dennis Olson at Bellator 144 on October 23, 2015. He won the fight via KO in the first round.

Ward made his international MMA debut on December 31, 2015, as a Bellator MMA representative at Rizin Fighting Federation 2. He faced Ken Hasegawa in a 179-pound catchweight bout and won the fight via submission in the second round.

On March 1, 2016, it was announced that Ward would face Strikeforce vet Evangelista Santos on April 22, 2016 at Bellator 153. He lost the fight via heel hook submission in the first round.

Ward next faced Saad Awad at Bellator 163 on November 4, 2016. He won the fight via knockout in the first round.

Ward made a quick return to the cage, facing Paul Daley in the co-main event at Bellator 170 on January 21, 2017. He lost the fight due to a flying knee in the first round.

Ward faced Fernando Gonzalez at Bellator 182 on August 25, 2017. He lost the fight via a guillotine choke submission in the third round.

Ward was expected to face David Rickels at Bellator 185 on October 20, 2017. Ward pulled out of the fight due to an injury and, as a result, Rickels was removed from the fight card.

After a 15-month layoff, Ward was scheduled to face Andre Fialho on October 12, 2018, at Bellator 207. However on September 10, 2018, Ward notified the promotion that he will retire from MMA.

Bare-knuckle boxing
On April 8, 2019, Bare Knuckle FC president David Feldman announced that Ward had signed a contract with the organization.

Ward was expected to face former UFC Welterweight champion Johny Hendricks at World Bare Knuckle Fighting Federation's inaugural event on November 9, 2018. During the fight week, Ward announced that he wouldn't be fighting at the event due to a contract dispute.

Return to Bellator MMA

Ward battled with drug addiction throughout his career and after spending time in jail Ward decided to attend rehab and get sober. His first mixed martial arts bout in four and a half years took place at Bellator 274 on February 19, 2022 against Brandon Bell. He won the bout in dominant fashion, finishing Bell in the second round via technical knockout.

On April 15, 2022, it was announced that Ward signed a multi-fight contract with Bellator.

Ward's next bout in Bellator was at Bellator 282 on June 24, 2022 against Kassius Kayne. He won the bout via TKO stoppage in the second round.

Ward faced Sabah Homasi on February 4, 2023 at Bellator 290. Ward won by technical knockout in the second round, after dropping Homasi with a head kick and finishing the bout with ground and pound.

Personal life 
On October 24, 2016, at approximately 7:00pm, Ward rescued a baby trapped in a stroller abandoned along a busy New London road. The baby was subsequently taken to a nearby fire department – and later hospital – where she was determined to be without injury.

Controversies
On July 4, 2016, at approximately 12:10pm, Ward was arrested by the Waterford Police Department on the charges of breach of peace, interfering with a police officer, threatening a public safety officer, and assault on a public safety officer. According to the police report, an inebriated Ward got into an altercation with his female companion (who was also arrested for breach of peace) and subsequently resisted arrest by physically and verbally assaulting the officers present. Officers were also unable to process Ward at the time of his arrest due to his continued belligerence as he repeatedly banged his head on the Plexiglas divider of the squad car and “continued extreme aggression” in his jail cell. Ward proceeded to call three of the four policemen by their first names as well as threatened them and their families. Police also noted that Ward urinated all over the floor and door of his jail cell. He was released on a $100,000 bond and is scheduled to appear in court on August 16, 2016. In December 2019, news surfaced that Ward was sentenced to 120 days in prison and is expected to be released early 2020.

Ward also has a pending case from a January 3, 2014, incident, where he is charged with disobeying the signal of a police officer, reckless driving, and interfering with a police officer.

Championships and accomplishments

Amateur wrestling
National Collegiate Athletic Association
NCAA Division III All-American out of Johnson & Wales University (2010)
NCAA Division III 184 lb: Runner-up out of Johnson & Wales University (2010)
New England Wrestling Association
NEWA Championship 184 lb: Champion out of Johnson & Wales University (2011)
Ithaca College Athletics
Ithaca College Invitational 184 lb: Champion out of Johnson & Wales University (2009)
Ithaca College Invitational 197 lb: 3rd place out of Johnson & Wales University (2010)

Mixed martial arts
Bellator MMA
Bellator Season Nine Middleweight Tournament Winner

Mixed martial arts record

|-
|Win
|align=center|17–6
|Sabah Homasi
|TKO (head kick and punches)
|Bellator 290
|
|align=center|2
|align=center|1:34
|Inglewood, California, United States
|
|-
|Win
|align=center|16–6
|Kassius Kayne
|TKO (punches)
|Bellator 282
|
|align=center|2
|align=center|1:11
|Uncasville, Connecticut, United States
|
|-
|Win
|align=center|15–6
|Brandon Bell
|TKO (punches)
|Bellator 274
|
|align=center|2
|align=center|0:32
|Uncasville, Connecticut, United States
|
|-
|Loss
|align=center|14–6
|Fernando Gonzalez
|Submission (guillotine choke)
|Bellator 182
|
|align=center|3
|align=center|1:02
|Verona, New York, United States
|
|-
|Loss
|align=center|14–5
|Paul Daley
|KO (flying knee)
|Bellator 170
|
|align=center|1
|align=center|2:27
|Inglewood, California, United States
|
|-
|Win
|align=center|14–4
|Saad Awad
|KO (punches)
|Bellator 163
|
|align=center|1
|align=center|1:26
|Uncasville, Connecticut, United States
|
|-
|Loss
|align=center|13–4
|Evangelista Santos
|Submission (heel hook)
|Bellator 153
|
|align=center|1
|align=center|0:30
|Uncasville, Connecticut, United States
|
|-
|Win
|align=center|13–3
|Ken Hasegawa
|Submission (rear-naked choke)
|Rizin Fighting Federation 2
|
|align=center|2
|align=center|1:52
|Saitama, Saitama, Japan
|Catchweight (179 lbs) bout.
|-
|Win
|align=center|12–3
|Dennis Olson
|KO (punches)
|Bellator 144
|
|align=center|1
|align=center|4:37
|Uncasville, Connecticut, United States
|
|-
|Win
|align=center|11–3
|Roger Carroll
|KO (punch)
|Bellator 140
|
|align=center|1
|align=center|2:06
|Uncasville, Connecticut, United States
|
|-
|Win
|align=center|10–3
|Curtis Millender
|Submission (rear-naked choke)
|Bellator 134
|
|align=center|1
|align=center|1:39
|Uncasville, Connecticut, United States
|Welterweight debut.
|-
|Loss
|align=center|9–3
|Tamdan McCrory
|KO (punches)
|Bellator 123
|
|align=center|1
|align=center|0:21
|Uncasville, Connecticut, United States
|
|-
|Loss
|align=center|9–2
|Alexander Shlemenko
|Submission (guillotine choke)
|Bellator 114
|
|align=center|2
|align=center|1:22
|West Valley City, Utah, United States
|For the Bellator Middleweight Championship.
|-
|Win
|align=center|9–1
|Mikkel Parlo
|TKO (punches)
|Bellator 107
|
|align=center| 2
|align=center| 1:39
|Thackerville, Oklahoma, United States
|
|-
|Win
|align=center|8–1
|Joe Pacheco
|Submission (guillotine choke)
|Bellator 102
|
|align=center|2
|align=center|2:41
|Visalia, California, United States
|Bellator Season Nine Middleweight Tournament Semifinal.
|-
|Win
|align=center|7–1
|Justin Torrey
|TKO (punches)
|Bellator 98
|
|align=center|2
|align=center|3:28
|Uncasville, Connecticut, United States
|Bellator Season Nine Middleweight Tournament Quarterfinal.
|-
|Win
|align=center|6–1
|Yair Moguel
|Submission (rear-naked choke)
|Bellator 91
|
|align=center|1
|align=center|0:57
|Rio Rancho, New Mexico, United States
|Catchweight (187 lbs) bout; Moguel missed weight.
|-
|Loss
|align=center|5–1
|Aaron Johnson
|Submission (armbar)
|Bellator 89
|
|align=center|1
|align=center|0:15
|Charlotte, North Carolina, United States
|
|-
|Win
|align=center|5–0
|Sam McCoy
|KO (punches)
|Bellator 81
|
|align=center|1
|align=center|2:49
|Kingston, Rhode Island, United States
|
|-
|Win
|align=center|4–0
|Shedrick Goodridge
|TKO (punches)
|CES MMA: Real Pain
|
|align=center|1
|align=center|2:36
|Providence, Rhode Island, United States
|Catchweight (188 lbs) bout.
|-
|Win
|align=center|3–0
|Harley Beekman
|Decision (unanimous)
|CES MMA: Never Surrender
|
|align=center|3
|align=center|5:00
|Lincoln, Rhode Island, United States
|
|-
|Win
|align=center|2–0
|Brennan Scholz
|TKO (punches)
|CES MMA: Extreme Measures
|
|align=center|1
|align=center|1:32
|Lincoln, Rhode Island, United States
|Catchweight (190 lbs) bout.
|-
|Win
|align=center|1–0
|Mike Manna
|TKO (punches)
|USFL: War in the Woods 2
|
|align=center|1
|align=center|2:15
|Ledyard, Connecticut, United States
|

References

1988 births
Living people
Sportspeople from New London, Connecticut
American male sport wrestlers
Amateur wrestlers
American male mixed martial artists
Mixed martial artists from Connecticut
Middleweight mixed martial artists
Mixed martial artists utilizing boxing
Mixed martial artists utilizing collegiate wrestling
People from Waterford, Connecticut
Johnson & Wales University alumni